Vakilabad (also Romanized as Vakīlābād) is a village in Vakilabad Rural District, in the Central District of Arzuiyeh County, Kerman Province, Iran. At the 2006 census, its population was 4,010, in 859 families.

References 

Populated places in Arzuiyeh County